= 2700099C18Rik =

Pseudogene in the species Mus musculus

NDC80 homolog, kinetochore complex component pseudogene is a mouse pseudogene with symbol 2700099C18Rik.
